"Slow Down" is the 11th single by English R&B band Loose Ends from their third studio album, Zagora. It was released in September 1986 by MCA Records and produced by Loose Ends' longtime collaborator Nick Martinelli.  The single was the group's second and last number one on the Soul Singles chart.

Track listing
7” Single: VS884 
 "Slow Down" 4.06
 "Slow Down (Slow Jam)" 3.11

12” Single: VS884-12
 "Slow Down (Extended Version)"  7.31
 "Slow Down (Slow Jam)"  7.08

2nd 12” Single: VS884-12 - limited edition with bonus 12"
 "Slow Down (Extended Version)"  7.31
 "Slow Down (Slow Jam)"  7.08
 "Gonna Make You Mine (Westside Remix) 5.43  *
 "Slow Down (Dub Version) 6.47

* The Westside Remix of 'Gonna Make You Mine' was released on CD in 1992 on the album 'Tighten Up Volume 1' remix project.

Charts

References

External links
 Slow Down (1986) at Discogs.

1986 songs
Loose Ends (band) songs
1986 singles
Song recordings produced by Nick Martinelli
Songs written by Carl McIntosh (musician)
Songs written by Jane Eugene
Songs written by Steve Nichol
1985 songs
MCA Records singles